Back to Life is a 1913 American silent short drama film directed by Allan Dwan and featuring Pauline Bush, J. Warren Kerrigan, William Worthington and Lon Chaney. This was Chaney's first film with director Allan Dwan, which was followed by a dozen more. The film is now considered lost.

Plot
A gambler brings his sick wife to live in the mountains after learning she has tuberculosis and will need special care. The gambler soon tires of caring for his wife and becomes attached to a young girl at a local saloon.

The gambler's wife discovers her husband's infidelity and wanders off into the forest to die. There she finds a hunted outlaw named Jim, weak from loss of blood, and she nurses him back to health. Jim, in turn, takes her to an old couple in the hills, who then nurse her back to health.

The wife decides to try to regain her husband's love, but upon returning home, she finds he has been shot dead by a rival (Lon Chaney) in a saloon brawl. She goes back to Jim, and they find happiness together.

Cast
 William Worthington as The Gambler
 Pauline Bush as The Wife
 J. Warren Kerrigan as Jim, the Outlaw
 Jessalyn Van Trump as The Dance Hall Girl
 Lon Chaney as The Rival

Reception
Moving Picture World wrote: "Warren Kerrigan, as a redeemed bad man in this admirable picture, presents a likable character...The story is well dramatized, the action is spirited and the whole gets over in good shape."

Universal Weekly wrote: "Like all of director Allan Dwan's features, it has tons of action throughout."

References

External links

1913 films
1913 drama films
1913 short films
1913 lost films
Silent American drama films
American silent short films
American black-and-white films
Films directed by Allan Dwan
Lost American films
Lost drama films
Universal Pictures short films
1910s American films
1910s English-language films
American drama short films